Verny is a rural locality (a khutor) in Volokonovsky District, Belgorod Oblast, Russia. The population was 36 as of 2010. There is 1 street.

Geography 
Verny is located 34 km west of Volokonovka (the district's administrative centre) by road. Bochanka is the nearest rural locality.

References 

Rural localities in Volokonovsky District